Thomas Kind Bendiksen (born 8 August 1989) is a Norwegian association footballer. He currently plays for Tromsdalen.

Career

Club
A Norwegian youth international, Bendiksen signed for Rangers on 31 August 2007 on a three-year deal from Harstad IL. Rangers paid the Norwegian side 1 million Norwegian krone (around £90,000). A long-term knee injury put his career on hold and ruled him out of the entire 2008–09 season and most of the following season.

Bendiksen impressed in reserve team games when he returned to action late in the 2009–10 season, and he was named as a substitute for a league match against Hibernian in April 2010. Bendiksen made his first 'first team' appearance in a pre-season friendly match against Queen of the South in July 2010. After further injury problems, he agreed a new six-month contract in July 2011. Bendiksen scored a goal in a friendly match against Hamburg, after which he was offered a new contract. He played his first competitive match for Rangers on 3 December 2011, in a 2–1 win home against Dunfermline Athletic.

Bendiksen rejected the offer of a new contract by Rangers and instead signed a deal with Tromsø.

Molde
On 23 December 2014 Bendiksen signed for Molde FK.

On 29 July 2015, Bendiksen joined Tromsø on loan for the remainder of the 2015 season.

On 31 March 2016, Bendiksen joined Elfsborg on a season-long loan deal.

He left the club on 5 December 2016, when his contract was terminated.

Career statistics

Club

International

Statistics accurate as of match played 18 January 2014

References

External links 

1989 births
Living people
Norwegian footballers
Association football midfielders
Harstad IL players
Rangers F.C. players
Tromsø IL players
Molde FK players
IF Elfsborg players
Sandefjord Fotball players
Tromsdalen UIL players
Scottish Premier League players
Eliteserien players
Norwegian First Division players
Norwegian Second Division players
Allsvenskan players
Norwegian expatriate footballers
Expatriate footballers in Scotland
Norwegian expatriate sportspeople in Scotland
Norway international footballers
People from Harstad
Sportspeople from Troms og Finnmark